Nebraska Highway 41 is a highway in Nebraska. Its western terminus is in Clay Center at an intersection with Nebraska Highway 14 and Nebraska Spur 18D. Its eastern terminus is at an intersection with Nebraska Highway 50 north of Tecumseh.

Route description
Nebraska Highway 41 begins in Clay Center at an intersection with Nebraska Highway 14 and Nebraska Spur 18D. It goes east out of Clay Center into farmland until Geneva. In Geneva, it runs on an old alignment of U.S. Highway 81. It meets US 81 just east of Geneva and continues east until meeting Nebraska Highway 15. It turns east and at Wilber, meets Nebraska Highway 103. It continues east through Clatonia and briefly overlaps U.S. Highway 77. It continues east and meets Nebraska Highway 43 at Adams. Highway 41 continues east until Sterling, where it then angles southeasterly until St. Mary. After St. Mary, the highway turns straight east again and ends at Nebraska Highway 50 north of Tecumseh.

Major intersections

References

External links

Nebraska Roads: NE 41-60

041
Transportation in Clay County, Nebraska
Transportation in Fillmore County, Nebraska
Transportation in Saline County, Nebraska
Transportation in Gage County, Nebraska
Transportation in Johnson County, Nebraska